DEAC SportCampus is a sports campus in Debrecen, Hungary. The center football field is home to the association football side Debreceni EAC and Debreceni VSC II. The stadium has a capacity of 1,500.

External links 
Magyarfutball.hu 

Football venues in Hungary